I Like to Work (Mobbing) is a 2004  Italian drama film directed by Francesca Comencini. It won the Panorama section Ecumenical Jury Prize at the 54th Berlin International Film Festival. It also won the Nastro d'Argento for best script.

Cast 

Nicoletta Braschi: Anna
Camille Dugay Comencini: Morgana
Marina Buoncristiani: Marina  
Roberta Celea: Roberta  
Assunta Cestaro: Sindacalista

See also 
 List of Italian films of 2004

References

External links

2004 films
Italian drama films
2004 drama films
Films set in Rome
2000s Italian films